The 1981 NAIA women's basketball tournament was the inaugural tournament held by the NAIA to determine the national champion of women's college basketball among its members in the United States and Canada.

Kentucky State defeated Texas Southern in the championship game, 73–67, to claim the Thorobrettes' first NAIA national title.

The tournament was played in Kansas City, Missouri.

Qualification

The inaugural tournament field was set at eight teams. All teams were seeded.

The tournament utilized a simple single-elimination format, with an additional third-place game for the two semifinal losers.

Bracket

See also
1981 AIAW National Division I Basketball Championship
1981 AIAW National Division II Basketball Championship
1981 AIAW National Division III Basketball Championship
1981 NAIA men's basketball tournament

References

NAIA
NAIA Women's Basketball Championships
Tournament
1980–81 NAIA championships
NAIA women's basketball tournament